Bobsleigh Skeleton Australia is the governing body for the sports of bobsleigh and skeleton in Australia.

History

Australians have been active in ice sliding sports since the early days. Australian student George Robertson came equal first in the first international Luge race held in Davos, Switzerland in 1883. During the 1930s Australian Frederick McEvoy competed with the Great Britain team in bobsleigh to win several Olympic and World Championship medals.

This early success wavered after World War Two. When Australians started traveling to Europe in the early 1970s some thrill-seekers were exposed to the sports of bobsleigh and skeleton. Leading the way for the new wave of Australians becoming interested in the sport was Philip Morgan Giles. Morgan Giles piloted the first Australian team to compete at an FIBT world championship in 2-man bobsleigh in 1974.

The Australian Bobsleigh Federation was established in 1985. This allowed Australia to become a recognised member of the Federation de Internationale Bobsleigh et de Tobogganing (FIBT). This paved the way forward for Australian teams to compete in FIBT races and compete at the Olympic Games.

Australia has sent 8 Skeleton athletes and 29 Bobsleigh athletes to 8 Winter Olympic Games.

Bobsleigh and Skeleton Australia was established in 2013 to govern the sports of bobsleigh and skeleton within Australia. It is the recognised governing body for bobsleigh and skeleton for Australia with the International Bobsleigh and Skeleton Federation.

Olympic Performances

References

External links
 

Sports governing bodies in Australia
Winter sports in Australia
Skeleton in Australia
2013 establishments in Australia
Sports organizations established in 2013
Bobsleigh in Australia